Karosa C 934 is an intercity bus produced by bus manufacturer Karosa from the Czech Republic, in the years 1996 to 2002. In 1999 was introduced modernised version C934E. It was succeeded by Karosa C 954 in 2002.

Construction features 
Karosa C 934 is basic model of Karosa 900 series. C 934 is derived from its predecessor, Karosa C 734 inter city bus, and also unified with city bus models such as B 941 and B 932. Body is semi-self-supporting with frame and engine with manual gearbox is placed in the rear part. Only rear axle is propulsed. Front axle is independent, rear axle is solid. All axles are mounted on air suspension. On the right side are two doors. Inside are used leatherette seats. Drivers cab is not separated from the rest of the vehicle.

Production and operation 
In the year 1996 started serial production, which continued until 2002. Since 1999 were buses produced only in modernised version C 934 E, which has new solid front axle Škoda-LIAZ, ABS and ASR.

Currently, number of Karosa C934 buses is decreasing, due to high age of buses.

Historical vehicles 
Any historical vehicle was not saved yet.

See also 
  Article about Karosa C 934 and C 935 operated in Prague

 List of buses

Buses manufactured by Karosa
Buses of the Czech Republic